The Saratoga Revolution are a collegiate summer baseball team based in Saratoga Springs, New York that plays in the New York Collegiate Baseball League.

External links
NYCBL official website
NYCBL team information

Amateur baseball teams in New York (state)
Saratoga Springs, New York